Drakar och Demoner (Swedish for Dragons and Demons, in Sweden commonly referred to by the abbreviation "DoD") is a Swedish fantasy role-playing game first published in 1982 by the game publishing company Äventyrsspel ("Adventure Games", later renamed Target Games).

Development history 
The first edition was a translation of Steve Perrin's Basic Role-Playing (which in turn is based on RuneQuest) combined with the Magic World booklet.

The second edition was published in 1984, rewriting the text from scratch, fixing many translation errors, glitches in the rules, with no other major changes made. One of the available player races, the anthropomorphic ducks, was incorporated from Glorantha.

A rules transition began in 1985, not with the third edition which mostly corrected spelling errors, but with the publication of an "Expert" rule expansion: Drakar och Demoner Expert. Among other things it introduced hit locations, and the use of a 20-sided die instead of the percentile die for skill rolls.

The fourth edition in 1991 was a major revision of the rules, superseding Drakar och Demoner Expert by incorporating it into the basic rules and then expanding them.

In 1994, Target Games released a fifth edition, called Drakar och Demoner Chronopia. This edition came with an integrated campaign setting. Changes to the rules were minor, mostly reflecting the new setting.

In the late 1990s, Target Games found itself in financial difficulties and discontinued their line of role-playing games. The rights to Drakar och Demoner were transferred to Paradox Entertainment, who in turn licensed them to RiotMinds. RiotMinds published a new version of the game in 2000. This sixth edition was a complete overhaul of the game rules, supporting a much less generic game world. The idea of "Expert" rules was reused, and many rules expansions followed.

When RiotMinds released their Drakar och Demoner ruleset, it featured a concept very close to levels ("yrkesnivåer"). It didn't take long before an official addendum appeared on their website, with optional rules on how to play without this feature. In the subsequent reprints (as well as later editions) little or no traces of "yrkesnivåer" remain.

In 2006, RiotMinds published the seventh edition, which has many rule changes to better support its campaign world. Among those were the removal of the basic character stats (grundegenskaper) which were replaced with 'exceptional abilities' (exceptionella karaktärsdrag), and the introduction of specializations of skills. This boxed edition is called Drakar och Demoner Trudvang.

In 2015 RiotMinds announced a re-release of the 1987 edition of the game featuring new art and minor fixes but otherwise identical. A line of products including several new campaigns was planned after its August 2016 release. On May 16, 2016 RiotMinds announced that Drakar och Demoner Trudvang would be released in an English version, under the name Trudvang Chronicles.

In 2019, RiotMinds successfully funded its Kickstarter for Ruin Masters, an updated, and re-designed English version of the classic game, including a rich portfolio of new art and design, a cover from Adrian Smith, interior art from renowned artists such as Jesper Ejsing, Johan Egerkrans and Alvaro Tapia, known for his art in Trudvang Chronicles. The Ruin Masters Bestiary was successfully funded on Kickstarter in 2021.

In August 2021, RiotMinds announced that it had sold the IP for Drakar och Demoner to Fria Ligan (Free League Publishing). RiotMinds stated they would continue to support develop the Ruin Masters game and its setting Caldarox under its own brand with no connection to Drakar och Demoner, other than it is built on a BRP-clone.

Campaign settings 
Like many other early role-playing games, Drakar och Demoner started out without a fully developed campaign setting.

The first campaign setting of Drakar och Demoner was called Ereb Altor (Ereb being the name of the continent where most - if not all - official adventures take place, Altor being the name of the planet on which Ereb is located). It was created bit by bit by different writers through adventures and source books creating a somewhat haphazard world; medieval feudal states exist side-by-side with comparably advanced Renaissance-styled nations.

With the fifth version Target Games decided to introduce a new, darker campaign setting named Chronopia, thereby ceasing publication of new material for Ereb. After an outcry among fans of Ereb ensued, Target Games decided that Ereb and Chronopia both existed on Altor but on different hemispheres. At this time, a tabletop miniatures game line was also started; see Chronopia below. In 2015, Cabinet Holdings acquired Paradox Entertainment Inc. and all subsidiaries and their properties, including Chronopia.

RiotMinds created a brand-new campaign setting called Trudvang, which utilized cultures, creatures and monsters based on Scandinavian folklore instead of the standard fantasy creatures.

Other media

Miniature games 
First Edition: Chronopia: Dark Fantasy Battles (1997) was a tabletop miniature game published by Target Games. Players would field an army composed of 25 mm miniatures which were composed of pewter, resin, or a composite of both. The game featured eight different armies for players to choose from.

Second Edition: Chronopia: War in the Eternal Realm (2002) was a tabletop miniature game published by Excelsior Entertainment.

In 2015, Cabinet Holdings acquired Paradox Entertainment Inc. and all subsidiaries and their properties, including Chronopia.

Computer game 
In 1999, a Drakar och Demoner video game was released by the name of Drakar och Demoner: Själarnas Brunn (released as Dragonfire: The Well of Souls internationally). It was made by then-defunct Swedish developer ComputerHouse GBG AB. The game takes place in the original campaign setting of Ereb Altor six years after the events in the popular adventure trilogy Den Nidländska Reningen.

Film 
In 2013, 28 minute short film Drakar och Demoner - Tronländaren was released.

References

External links 
 
http://www.stacken.kth.se/~maxz/swerpg/drakar.html
Riotminds website
Fan website (Danish)

Fantasy role-playing games
Basic Role-Playing System
Swedish role-playing games
Role-playing games introduced in 1982
Video games developed in Sweden